

Arts

Literature
 Muhammad ibn Jarir al-Tabari (838-923), was a Persian world historian and theologian (the most famous and widely influential person called al-Tabari).
 Espahbod Sa'ad ad-Din Varavini  who wrote the book called Marzuban-nama, and also a Divan of poetry in the Ṭabarí dialect, known as the Níkí-nama.
 Ibn Isfandiyar, historian, author of a history of Tabaristan (Tarikh-i Tabaristan).
 Mírzá Asadu’llah Fádil Mázandarání (1880–1957), Iranian Bahá'í scholar.
 Musa ibn Khalil Mazandarani, 19th century Persian scribe and scholar.
 Sayyed Zahiruddin Mar'ashi
 Parviz Natel-Khanlari

Poetry

 Nima Youshij 
 Mohammad Zohari
 Amir Pazevari
 Mina Assadi
 Seyed Karim Amiri Firuzkuhi
 Mohsen Emadi

Music

 Gholam Hossein Banan
 Abdolhossein Mokhtabad
 Delkash
 Bijan Mortazavi
 Mohammad Donyavi
 Afshin
 Benyamin Bahadori
 Farhang Sharif
 Parisa
 Simin Ghanem
 Majid Akhshabi

Architecture
 Omar Tiberiades (Abû Hafs 'Umar ibn al-Farrukhân al-Tabarî Amoli) (d.c.815), Persian astrologer and architect.

Cinema

 Shahab Hosseini
 Parinaz Izadyar
 Roya Nonahali
 Khosrow Sinai
 Davoud Rashidi
 Maryam Kavyani
 Kambiz Dirbaz
 Ladan Mostofi
 Mostafa Zamani
 Mohammad Ali Sadjadi
 Anahita Hemmati
 Irene Zazians
 Reza Allamehzadeh
 Abbas Amiri Moghaddam
 Saba Kamali
 Ardalan Shoja Kaveh

Portrait
 Mokarrameh Ghanbari

Scholar

 Manouchehr Sotodeh
 Mohammad Taqi Danesh Pajouh
 Ahmad Ghahreman

History 
Arash
Maziar

Science

Medicine, Biology and Chemistry
 Ali ibn Sahl Rabban al-Tabari His stature, however, was eclipsed by his more famous pupil, Muhammad ibn Zakarīya Rāzi.
 Abul Hasan al-Tabari,  a 10th-century Iranian physician.

Social sciences
 Abu'l Tayyeb Tabari was a jurisconsult, judge (qāżī), and professor of legal sciences; he was regarded by his contemporaries as one of the leading Shafeʿites of 5th/11th century Baghdad.

New Science
 Ali Yachkaschi
 Moslem Bahadori
 Iraj Malekpour
 Pooran Farrokhzad
 Shahrokh Meskoob

Philosophy
 Fakhr al-Din al-Razi Theologian and philosopher.
 Ibn Hindu

Physician and astrologer

 Muhammad ibn Mahmud Amuli
 Abū Sahl al-Qūhī
 Al-Nagawri
 Sahl ibn Bishr
 Al-Nagawri
 Tunakabuni
 Al-Natili

Athletics

Wrestling

 Abdollah Movahed 
 Imam-Ali Habibi 
 Ghasem Rezaei
 Hassan Rangraz
 Reza Yazdani
 Hassan Yazdani
 Reza Soukhteh-Saraei
 Majid Torkan
 Askari Mohammadian
 Abbas Hajkenari
 Mehdi Taghavi

 Komeil Ghasemi
 Morad Mohammadi
 Ahmad Mohammadi
 Mehdi Hajizadeh
 Masoud Esmaeilpour
 Ezzatollah Akbari
 Ali Asghar Bazri
 Behnam Ehsanpour

 Bashir Babajanzadeh
 Reza Simkhah

Sports (Other)

 Behdad Salimi
 Mohammad Reza Khalatbari
 Farhad Majidi
 Mehrdad Oladi
 Mohsen Bengar
 Rahman Ahmadi
 Hossein Tavakkoli
 Hanif Omranzadeh
 Hadi Norouzi
 Adel Gholami
 Mojtaba Mirzajanpour
 Sheys Rezaei
 Morteza Pouraliganji
 Mojtaba Abedini
 Sohrab Entezari
 Farshid Talebi
 Mousa Nabipour
 Shahab Gordan
 Noshad Alamiyan
 Sousan Hajipour
 Mahmoud Fekri
 Ramin Rezaeian
 Bahador Molaei

 Maysam Baou
 Omid Ebrahimi
 Morteza Mehrzad
 Farzan Ashourzadeh
 Shoja' Khalilzadeh
 Omid Alishah
 Hamed Kavianpour
 Kianoush Rahmati
 Ebrahim Taghipour
 Mohsen Yousefi
 Javad Asghari Moghaddam
 Manouchehr Boroumand
 Jasem Delavari
 Peiman Hosseini

Royalty

 Reza Shah Pahlavi
 Mohammad Reza Pahlavi
 Dowlatshah
 Khayr al-Nisa Begum
 Khurshid of Tabaristan

Military
 Ali Akbar Shiroodi
 Abbas Mirza
 Ahmad Keshvari
 Al-Mu'ayyad Ahmad
 Sardar Rafie Yanehsari
 Mohammad Rouyanian
 Iskandar-i Shaykhi

Politics

 Ali Larijani
 Mohammad Vali Khan Tonekaboni
 Manuchehr Mottaki
 Ehsan Tabari
 Hossein Ghods-Nakhai
 Noureddin Kianouri 
 Ali-Akbar Davar
 Esfandiar Rahim Mashaei
 Hamid Reza Chitgar
 Sadeq Larijani
 Mohammad-Javad Larijani
 Bagher Larijani
 Ali Akbar Nategh-Nouri
 Mirza Aqa Khan Nuri
 Ahmad Tavakoli
 Davoud Hermidas-Bavand
 Sam Dastyari
 Ali Kordan
 Elaheh Koulaei

 Abdul Karim Hashemi Nejad
 Reza Sheykholeslam
 Shamseddin Hosseini
 Hassan Ghashghavi
 Mirza Hassan Khan Esfandiary

Christianity
 Hossein Fallah Noshirvani
 Shaban Dibaj

Judaism
 Daniel al-Kumisi

Baha'i Faith
 Baha'u'llah- The founder of the Baha'i Faith was born and grew up in Nur, Mazandaran

Bab
 Quddús

Islamic scholars

 Abdollah Javadi-Amoli
 Mirza Hashem Amoli
 Abd al-Qahir al-Jurjani
 Muhammad Taqi Amoli
 Haydar Amuli
 Ibn Furak
 Ali Asghar Mazandarani
 Mirza Husain Noori Tabarsi
 Shaykh Tabarsi
 Yasubedin Rastegar Jooybari

References

 
 01
Mazandarani people
Mazandaranis
Ethnic groups in Iran
History of Mazandaran Province